Heiki Trolla (born 10 August 1970 in Võru), better known by his artist name Navitrolla, is an Estonian painter whose work has been described as naivist or surrealist. Most of his works depict fantastic landscapes and animals. He spent his childhood in the villages of Trolla and Navi near Võru, which is the source of his pseudonym.

He works in his atelier in Tartu, but has a gallery in Tallinn.

Navitrolla's uncle is philosopher of science Enn Kasak.

External links

References

1970 births
Living people
People from Võru
21st-century Estonian painters